Who Wants to Be an Astronaut? is an upcoming reality television series that is produced by Discovery Channel. The contestants of the show compete to win a seat on the planned private crew mission Axiom Mission 2 in 2023.

Discovery Channel began looking for contestants in May 2021.

References

Discovery Channel original programming
2020s American reality television series
2022 American television series debuts